Wilfredo Andrés Peláez Esmite (27 October 1930 – 23 May 2019) was an Uruguayan basketball player who competed in the 1952 Summer Olympics. Pelaez was a member of the Uruguayan team, which won the bronze medal. He played four matches.

References

External links

1930 births
2019 deaths
Basketball players at the 1952 Summer Olympics
Olympic basketball players of Uruguay
Olympic bronze medalists for Uruguay
Uruguayan men's basketball players
Uruguayan people of Spanish descent
Olympic medalists in basketball
Medalists at the 1952 Summer Olympics
20th-century Uruguayan people